Bunker is a 2022 horror thriller film directed by Adrian Langley and written by Michael Huntsman. The film stars Roger Clark, Luke Baines, Kayla Radomski and Julian Feder.

Plot 
In a World War I bunker, paranoid soldiers face a satanic specter.

Cast 

 Roger Clark
 Luke Baines
 Kayla Radomski
 Julian Feder

Production 

Adrian Langley directed, Michael Huntsman is the screenwriter and both Jame Huntsman and Patrick Rizzotti produced the film.

Release 

The film premiered October 8, 2022 at Buffalo International Film Festival.

Critical reception 
Film aggregator Rotten Tomatoes holds an approval rating of 29% based on seven reviews. Bobby LePire at Film Threat awarded it 8 out of 10, Jonathan Hickman at Newnan Times-Herald gave it a 7 out of 10 while Roger Moore at Movie Nation scored in 1 out of 4.

References

External links 

 
 
 

2022 films
2022 horror films
Films set in bunkers
American horror thriller films
2022 horror thriller films